Paula Meehan (born 1955) is an Irish poet and playwright.

Life and work

Paula Meehan was born in Dublin in 1955, the eldest of six children. She subsequently moved to London with her parents where she attended St. Elizabeth's Primary School in Kingston upon Thames. She then returned to Dublin with her family where she attended a number of primary schools finishing her primary education at the Central Model Girls' School in Gardiner Street.

She began her secondary education at St. Michael's Holy Faith Covent in Finglas but was expelled for organising a protest march against the regime of the school. She studied for her Intermediate Certificate on her own and then went to Whitehall House Senior College, a vocational school, to study for her Leaving Certificate. Outside school she was a member of a dance drama group, became involved in band culture and, around 1970, began to write lyrics. Gradually composing song lyrics would give way to writing poetry.

At Trinity College, Dublin, (1972–1977) she studied English, History and Classical Civilization, taking five years to complete her Bachelor of Arts degree. This included one year off, spent travelling through Europe. While a student she was involved in street theatre and various kinds of performance.

After college she travelled again, spending long stretches in Greece, Germany, Scotland and England. She was offered a teaching fellowship at Eastern Washington University where she studied (1981–1983) with James J. McAuley in a two-year programme which led to a Master of Fine Arts degree in Poetry. Gary Snyder and Carolyn Kizer were among the distinguished visiting writers to have a profound influence on her work and on her thought.

She returned to Dublin in 1983.

Meehan has also written poetry for film, for contemporary dance companies and for collaborations with visual artists; her poems have been put to music by songwriters (including Christy Moore) and composers. Her poetry has been extensively published in translation, including substantial collections in French and German.

The 2015 Poetry Competition 'A Poem for Ireland' shortlisted her 1991 poem 'The Statue of the Virgin at Granard Speaks' in the final ten poems.

Meehan is a judge for the 2020 Griffin Poetry Prize.

Awards
In September 2013, Meehan was installed as the Ireland Professor of Poetry by President Michael D. Higgins.

Bibliography
 Paula Meehan: A Selected Bibliography by Jody Allen Randolph (2009)

References

External links

 Paula Meehan's page on the site of her Irish publisher, Dedalus Press
 Paula Meehan's page at Carcanet Press
 Paula Meehan's page at Wake Forest University Press
Review of Cell
Poetry International site with several poems
2009 video of Paula Meehan reading her poems

1955 births
Living people
Irish women poets
Irish women dramatists and playwrights
Aosdána members
Alumni of Trinity College Dublin
Eastern Washington University alumni
Writers from Dublin (city)
20th-century Irish poets
21st-century Irish poets
20th-century Irish women writers
21st-century Irish women writers
20th-century Irish dramatists and playwrights
21st-century Irish dramatists and playwrights